Odette Toulemonde is a 2006 French comedy film written and directed by Éric-Emmanuel Schmitt.

Cast 
 Catherine Frot - Odette Toulemonde
 Albert Dupontel - Balthazar Balsan
 Jacques Weber - Olaf Pims
 Fabrice Murgia - Rudy
 Nina Drecq - Sue Ellen
 Camille Japy - Nadine

External links 

2006 comedy films
2006 films
French comedy films
2000s French-language films
Films scored by Nicola Piovani
2000s French films